Moussa Bamba (born 6 January 1985 in Abidjan) is an Ivorian footballer who plays for Victoria Wanderers.

Club career
Bamba was playing for Jeunesse Club d'Abidjan in Ivory Coast Premier Soccer League
when he was scouted by Sheffield United F.C. He signed a 3-year contract with Sheffield United F.C in 2006. Due to work permit problems in the United Kingdom, he was loaned to Chengdu Blades F.C. Bamba was in the Chinese Premier Soccer League for 2 seasons, and went to Ferencvárosi TC in the 2008/2009 season. He was a regular player in the squad. He was signed from Chengdu Blades in 2008 alongside fellow Ivorians Dramane Kamate, Sékou Tidiane Souare and Kourouma Mohamed Lamine. Bamba Moussa with other colleagues helped Ferencvárosi TC to gain promotion to Hungarian premiership in June 2009. On 2 October 2009, he was on trial with FC Argeş Piteşti, but did not sign a contract. On 11 January 2010, Moussa joined Chimia Râmnicu Vâlcea. The club said they could not afford to acquire him, so he did not sign a contract. On 31 January 2010, Bamba joined to Sannat Lions FC of the Gozo First Division and signed a contract with the club. His work was well appreciated because he helped them to win the relegation match and stay in the first division and also helped them to win a cup. For the 2010–2011 season, he signed with SC Bacău, a second division club in Romania. In 2014, Moussa joined FC Zagon.

In July 2018, Moussa joined Victoria Wanderers. He played there until February 2019, where he joined CSM Lugoj.

Personal life
Bamba married on 3 November 2009 his Romanian girlfriend; he met his wife while playing in Hungary, the couple lived in Bucharest. On 7 December 2009 he was granted an indefinite residence in Romania.

References

1985 births
Living people
Ivorian footballers
Ivorian expatriate footballers
Expatriate footballers in Hungary
Footballers at the 2008 Summer Olympics
Expatriate footballers in China
Olympic footballers of Ivory Coast
Ivorian expatriate sportspeople in Hungary
Expatriate footballers in England
Ivorian expatriate sportspeople in China
Chinese Super League players
China League One players
Nemzeti Bajnokság I players
Chengdu Tiancheng F.C. players
Shenzhen F.C. players
JC d'Abidjan players
Ferencvárosi TC footballers
Victoria Hotspurs F.C. players
Xewkija Tigers F.C. players
Footballers from Abidjan
Association football midfielders
Gozo Football League First Division players